Xanthoconalia timossii is a beetle in the genus Xanthoconalia of the family Mordellidae. It was described in 1942 by Franciscolo.

References

Mordellidae
Beetles described in 1942